Edmund Joseph Francis Eiden (November 16, 1921 – January 29, 2017) was an American football center who played one season with the Detroit Lions. He played college football at the University of Scranton, having previously attended St. Mary's High School in Scranton.

References

2017 deaths
1921 births
American football centers
Detroit Lions players
Scranton Royals football players
Sportspeople from Scranton, Pennsylvania
Players of American football from Pennsylvania